Adamson's Peak is a mountain in the Hartz Mountains National Park in southern Tasmania, Australia. It is a prominent feature of the national park, appearing as an elegant double-peaked pyramid from the perspective of Esperance Bay, and is a popular venue with bushwalkers.

Ecology and vegetation types 
The hike up Adamson's Peak crosses a range of vegetation types, including dry and wet sclerophyll forest, and montane vegetation.

See also

 List of highest mountains of Tasmania

References

External links
 Parks Tasmania

Adamson's Peak
South West Tasmania